The River Towy is one of the longest rivers flowing entirely within Wales. It is noted for its sea trout and salmon fishing.

Route
The Towy rises within  of the source of the River Teifi on the lower slopes of Crug Gynan in the Cambrian Mountains. Flowing through the steep hills of the Tywi Forest, it forms the boundary between Ceredigion and Powys. The river flows generally south-westwards through Carmarthenshire, passing through the towns of Llandovery and Llandeilo.

In Carmarthen, it is joined by a substantial tributary, the Afon Gwili, at Abergwili. The estuary meets Carmarthen Bay east of the Pendine Sands along with the River Taf and both branches of the River Gwendraeth. The estuary was guarded by Llansteffan Castle, a 12th-century  Norman castle.

Damming of the Towy

About  from its source, the swift flow of the Towy is interrupted by the Llyn Brianne reservoir, created in 1972 by damming a section of the river to store winter rain for release into the river during dry periods. The reservoir supports the new abstraction at Nantgaredig which supplies a large swathe of south-east Wales with drinking water. The flow in the River Towy would have been unable to sustain such an abstraction were it not for the release of water from the upland reservoir.

Ecology

Fish
The Towy is a national draw for big sea trout (local name sewin), the seagoing form of the brown trout, Salmo trutta. These fish enter the river each spring and early summer to breed in the tributaries. The river is thought to produce more double-figure (10 lbs plus, or about 5 kg or more) sea trout than any other in Britain. In summer and autumn there is also a substantial run of Atlantic salmon (Salmo salar). In May the Towy has a run of the rare and protected twaite shad and allis shad. The Towy also contains brown trout, eels, pike, and a variety of small fish species, and is home to brook lampreys, river lampreys and sea lampreys.

The Towy has the distinction of having accidentally produced by far the biggest fish ever taken on rod and line in fresh water in Britain.

Mammals
The Towy has a thriving population of otters, as well as many commoner mammal species. Grey seals are common in the lower reaches and sometimes penetrate several miles up river in pursuit of sea trout and salmon.

Birds
The Towy and surrounding valley are home to a very large variety of water and wetland birds. Among the more distinctive species found along the river are sand martins, common sandpipers, little ringed plovers, dippers, kingfishers and grey wagtails. Red kites and buzzards are numerous. Goosanders and cormorants prey on sea trout and salmon.

Plants
The prevalence of oxbow lakes in the Towy valley provides some spectacular shows through the year. In summer at Bishop's Pond in Abergwili (an oxbow lake formed when the river flooded in 1802) there is a spectacular show of yellow water lilies on the pond when the water level drops and reed sweet-grass fringes the edges – a species also found nearby in the Teifi valley further west in Pembrokeshire, in Gower, in Powys (especially along the Montgomery Canal), on Anglesey and in several sites along the North Wales coast.

Glanrhyd Bridge disaster

On 19 October 1987, three days after the Great Storm of 1987, four people were killed when a train plunged off Glanrhyd Bridge near Llangadog into the flooded river.

Notes and references
Notes 
  
References

External links
 Southwest Wales and its Nature Reserves
 CCW - Protecting Allis Shad

Further reading

 Lillicrap, R. J. The Llyn Brianne Dam and the River Towy Scheme. Llandovery: Llandovery Publications, 1998.

Carmarthen Bay
Towy
Towy
 
Towy
Towy
Towy